Frat Bro, plural Frat Bros., can be:
 a shortening of Frat(ernity) brother
 the title of the 2006 movie Frat Bros.